Edina Szvoren (born 1974) is a Hungarian writer. She was born in Budapest and studied music at the Béla Bartók Music High School and the Franz Liszt Academy of Music.

Books 
 Pertu, 2010, Palatinus
 Nincs, és ne is legyen (There Is None, Nor Let There Be), 2012, Palatinus
 Az ország legjobb hóhéra (The Best Headsman in the Land), 2015, Magvető
 Verseim, 2018, Magvető

Awards 
 Móricz fellowship (2009) 
 Déry Award (2010) for Pertu
 Sándor Bródy Award (2011) for Pertu
 NKA advocacy (2012) 
 Artisjus Award (2013) for Nincs, és ne is legyen
 Attila József Prize (2014)
 EU Prize for Literature (2015) for Nincs, és ne is legyen
 Miklós Mészöly Prize (2019) for Verseim
 Libri Prize (2019) for Verseim

References

External links 
 writer's homepage

1974 births
Living people
Franz Liszt Academy of Music alumni
Writers from Budapest
Attila József Prize recipients
21st-century Hungarian women writers